Herbert Anton Hilger (born Bloeth; 3 February 1938 – 16 February 2023), known professionally as Tony Marshall, was a German Schlager and opera singer. Famous since 1971 with his hit song Schöne Maid, he also played in some comedies and was often seen on television.

Early life and education
Born in Baden-Baden, Marshall trained as an opera singer in Karlsruhe, graduating in 1965.

Career
However, rather than embarking on a career in the opera, in 1971, he had his first hit single, "Schöne Maid" (a year later also released in an English-language version, "Pretty Maid").
"Pretty Maid" peaked at number 16 in Australia in 1971.

In February 2009 he was appointed an Officer of the Order of Tahiti Nui.

Personal life and death
Marshall died in Baden-Baden on 16 February 2023, at the age of 85.

References

External links
 
 
 

1938 births
2023 deaths
People from Baden-Baden
German male singers
Schlager musicians
Recipients of the Cross of the Order of Merit of the Federal Republic of Germany
Recipients of the Order of Merit of Baden-Württemberg
Officers of the Order of Tahiti Nui